Raphel "Mime" Ortiz (30 November 1975 in San Juan, Puerto Rico) is a Puerto Rican professional football player. He is currently playing with Bayamon FC of the Puerto Rico Soccer League. He also plays for the Puerto Rico national team.

Player Biography on Islanders web page (Spanish) http://www.islandersfc.net/JUGADORES/MIME.htm

Living people
Puerto Rican footballers
USL First Division players
Puerto Rico Islanders players
1975 births
Academia Quintana players
Association football midfielders
Puerto Rico international footballers